The Peninsula Gateway is a newspaper based out of Gig Harbor, Washington, founded in 1917. The newspaper covers the local news of Gig Harbor and Key Peninsula.

Ownership and distribution 
The publication is owned by the McClatchy Company, and circulates approximately 10,000 papers. While the newspaper began in print format, it currently has online publications which can be found via the News Tribune and the Seattle Times.

The Peninsula Gateway is published once a week on Wednesdays.

References

External links 
 McClatchy Company
 The News Tribune
 The Seattle Times

Newspapers published in Washington (state)